Revision week is a period in the UK and other Commonwealth countries preceding examinations in high schools, higher education institutions, and military colleges. In American colleges, this period is known as a Reading Period. Generally, this period is one week long and free of classes or assessment, permitting students to spend the period revising material, generally in preparation for final exams. With the exception of Canadian post-secondary institutions, is not often allocated for mid-semester or ongoing assessment. Each day of such a period may be referred to as a reading day.

The term "revision week" is chiefly used in Commonwealth countries, where it is also known as "swotvac" or "stuvac". For post-secondary institutions in anglophone Canada, it is common to have "reading week" or "mid-term break" during the third week of February, coinciding with Family Day. While in francophone Canada, "semaine d'études," "semaine d'activités libres," or "semaine de lecture," typically falls on the first or second week of March. Some Canadian post-secondary institutions have even adopted reading weeks for the fall academic term, either in October or November, typically coinciding with Thanksgiving or Remembrance Day respectively. In the US this period is generally referred to as reading period or (as slang) dead week or dead days.

Swotvac

The term swotvac (swot vac, swotvac) is commonly used in Commonwealth countries, particularly Australia, to refer to this period. The term is a blend of the swot and vac (vacation), indicating the period free of classes. "Swot"  (or less commonly swat) is a dialectal word (Scottish) originally meaning "to sweat", which found use as a slang word describing a student paying careful attention to his work. Swot as a verb suggests acting like a swot, studying for one's exams.

The use of the uncommon and outmoded word 'swot' has led to the backronym  Study Week Or Take VACation or Study WithOut Teaching  (or Tuition)  VACation. There are many other different backronyms that can be derived, and the term stuvac (STUdy VACation, STUdent VACation) is also found.

Though once popular and used by universities as the official name for the week, the term seems to have fallen from favour and replaced with study week. As of 2014, however, it is still used by at least three of Australia's Group of 8 universities on the academic calendar.

Timing
It is scheduled after all the regular class lectures and before final exams. In some universities, reading days in the Fall semesters are being scheduled two days before Thanksgiving holidays to extend the holiday weekend like a spring break. However, this break is followed by the last week of classes and final examination week.

Duration
In many cases, student governments have lobbied to introduce, extend, or preserve reading days as a day exclusively for study and have run into conflict with teachers who like to use it as an additional day for lectures or exams. Another issue is that some students may prefer to take exams on reading day in order to get the semester over with.

See also
 Dead week
Schoolies week, vacation week following exams
Study skills

References

External links
Reading day policy out of touch with students, The Daily Campus, 11 November 2015
OPINION: Reading day: Wrong place, wrong time, Technician, Charlie Melville, Correspondent 27 Apr 2017
 Editorial: UConn must have early weekday reading days, The Daily Campus, 27 April 2017
 Therapy dogs, chocolate, Play-Doh: Universities offer ways to cope with finals, The College Fix, Jeremy Beaman, 8 May 2017

Academic culture
Educational time organization
Reading Week
Student culture in the United States